Pittaro is a surname. Notable people with the surname include:

Chris Pittaro (born 1961), American baseball player
José Pittaro (born 1946), Argentine cyclist
Sonny Pittaro, American baseball coach
Sonny Pittaro Field in New Jersey, U.S.